The Battle of Bruderholz took place on 22 March 1499 in the Swabian War between Swabian troops and forces of the Old Swiss Confederacy. The Swabians had raided several Swiss villages and were on their way back when they met troops from Lucerne, Solothurn, and Bern, who also came back from a raid in the Alsace. Anticipating the likely route of the Swabian troops, the Swiss soldiers concealed themselves in the woods at Bruderholz hill, near Basel. When the three times more numerous Swabians passed the woods, the Swiss attacked. The Swabian infantry quickly broke and fled the battlefield. The cavalry fought a delaying action allowing the infantry to escape before retreating also. Others fled to Basel but were refused entry. The Confederation lost only a single soldier while the Swabians lost about 80 men.

References

External links

Battles involving Switzerland
Swabian War
Conflicts in 1499